Mandjoogoordap Drive, meaning "meeting place of the heart" in the indigenous Noongar language, is a  dual carriageway road which links the Western Australian city of Mandurah to the Kwinana Freeway. It was officially opened on 7 October 2010. The road was known as Mandurah Entrance Road during its construction and is usually referred to as the Mandurah Link. Approximately  of the Mandurah line is located in its median strip.

Interchanges and intersections

Future extensions
The Department of Transport in Western Australia has indicated that when Tonkin Highway is extended to Pinjarra, Mandjoogoordap Drive will be extended east from its current terminus at Kwinana Freeway to meet it.

See also

References

External links

Southern Gateway Alliance - Mandurah Entrance Road

Roads in Western Australia
Mandurah